The men's 110 metres hurdles event at the 2019 Asian Athletics Championships was held on 23 and 24 April.

Medalists

Results

Heats
Qualification rule: First 2 in each heat (Q) and the next 3 fastest (q) qualified for the final.

Wind:Heat 1: +2.1 m/s, Heat 2: +1.0 m/s, Heat 3: +1.6 m/s

Final
Wind: +1.7 m/s

References

110
Sprint hurdles at the Asian Athletics Championships